The Mosaic Templars Cultural Center is a nationally-accredited, world-class Department of Arkansas Heritage Museum and Cultural Center in Little Rock, Arkansas, United States. Its mission is to collect, preserve, interpret and celebrate African American history, culture and community in Arkansas from 1870 to the present, and to inform and educate the public about Black achievements, especially in business, politics and the arts.

History
The Mosaic Templars of America was a black fraternal order founded by John E. Bush and Chester W. Keatts, two former slaves, in Little Rock, Arkansas in 1883. The organization originally provided illness, death, and burial insurance during an era when few basic services were available to black people. In the 1930s, the MTA began to feel the effects of the Great Depression and eventually ceased operations. However, a single chapter remains, in Barbados.

Various businesses rented the former Mosaic Templars building into the late 20th century, but changing business climates, urban renewal, and the construction of a nearby highway through the old West Ninth Street business district left the building without occupants and in disrepair. In 1992, the building was slated for demolition so that a fast-food restaurant could be built on the lot. On January 19, 1993, the Society for the Preservation of the Mosaic Templars of America Building, a group of urban preservationists, was incorporated to lobby against the building's destruction. The city of Little Rock purchased the building for $110,000 in late 1993, marking the first time the city purchased a building for historic preservation.

The structure burned to the ground on March 12, 2005. City voters passed a $185,000 1993 bond initiative to purchase additional property lots around the building, and planning began for an African American culture and history museum on the site. In 2001, the Society won passage of two laws in the Arkansas state legislature.  The first law provided money to fund the creation of the museum, and the second turned the museum over to the Department of Arkansas Heritage, a state agency.

A new building was constructed on the site, and the Mosaic Templars Cultural Center was turned over to the state.  The four-story museum opened on September 19, 2008. Members of the remaining Barbados lodge attended its opening.

Museum
The museum consists of four permanent exhibits on the first floor, and an Arkansas Black Hall of Fame on the third, and the Bush-Remmel genealogical research center and library on the second. A third-floor auditorium provides the opportunity to explore the story of Arkansas's African Americans through public forums, conferences, and performing arts.

See also
 Mosaic Templars State Temple
 List of museums focused on African Americans

References

Notes

Sources
 Beito, David T. From Mutual Aid to the Welfare State: Fraternal Societies and Social Services, 1890–1967. Chapel Hill: University of North Carolina Press, 2000.
 Bush, A. E., and P. L. Dorman, eds. History of the Mosaic Templars of America: Its Founders and Officials. Fayeteville: University of Arkansas Press, 2008. Earlier edition online at http://www.mosaictemplarspreservation.org/history_mosaic/history.pdf (accessed December 16, 2019).
 Bush, John E., IV. “Interview with John E. Bush IV.” Audio online at Butler Center AV/AR Audio Video Collection: John E. Bush IV Interview (accessed December 16, 2019).
 Butler, John Sibley. Entrepreneurship and Self-Help among Black Americans: A Reconsideration of Race and Economics. rev. ed. Albany: State University of New York Press, 2005.
 Jones, Adrienne A. “Black Organizing through Fraternal Orders: Black Mobilization and White Backlash.” In The Elaine Massacre and Arkansas: A Century of Atrocity and Resistance, 1819–1919, edited by Guy Lancaster. Little Rock: Butler Center Books, 2018.
 McDade, Bryan. “In Pursuit of a Better Life in the Vapor City: Understanding the Contributions of the Mosaic Templars of America in Hot Springs, Arkansas.” The Record 44 (2013): 6.1–6.24.
 Mosaic Templars Building Preservation Society. http://www.mosaictemplarspreservation.org/ (accessed December 16, 2019).
 Mosaic Templars Cultural Center. Department of Arkansas Heritage. http://www.mosaictemplarscenter.org/ (accessed December 16, 2019).

External links
 Mosaic Templars Cultural Center website

Museums in Little Rock, Arkansas
African-American museums in Arkansas
Museums established in 2008
2008 establishments in Arkansas